The Haddonfield Public Schools is a comprehensive community public school district serving students in pre-kindergarten through twelfth grade in Haddonfield, in Camden County, New Jersey, United States.

As of the 2020-21 school year, the district, comprising five schools, had an enrollment of 2,654 students and 220 classroom teachers (on an FTE basis), for a student–teacher ratio of 12:1.

The district is classified by the New Jersey Department of Education as being in District Factor Group "J", the highest of eight groupings. District Factor Groups organize districts statewide to allow comparison by common socioeconomic characteristics of the local districts. From lowest socioeconomic status to highest, the categories are A, B, CD, DE, FG, GH, I and J.

The district serves students from the Borough of Haddonfield, along with those from Pine Valley and Tavistock who attend the district's schools as part of sending/receiving relationships. The schools are funded through local property taxes. While most students are residents, a small number of students are enrolled on a tuition or voucher basis.

Each elementary school has approximately three sections in each grade. Facilities were modernized several years ago. Most students walk to school.

The middle school serves grades 6-8. Several world language courses are offered in German, French and Spanish, while some students take supplemental reading classes.  Over 20 co- and extra-curricular programs including our GSA, Diplomats for Diversity, or Technology Club are offered.

Awards, recognition and rankings
In 2015, Elizabeth Haddon School was one of 15 schools in New Jersey, and one of nine public schools, recognized as a National Blue Ribbon School in the exemplary high performing category by the United States Department of Education.

During the 2004-05 school year, Haddonfield Memorial High School was awarded the National Blue Ribbon School Award of Excellence by the United States Department of Education, the highest award an American school can receive.

Schools
Schools in the district (with 2018–19 enrollment data from the National Center for Education Statistics) are:
Elementary schools
Central Elementary School with 419 students in grades K-5
Shannon Simkus, Principal 
Elizabeth Haddon Elementary School with 367 students in grades K-5
Gerry Bissinger, Principal 
J. Fithian Tatem Elementary School with 422 students in grades PreK-5
Kimberly Dewrell, Principal 
Middle school
Haddonfield Middle School with 659 students in grades 6-8
Tracy Matozzo, Principal 
Karen Russo, Vice Principal 
High school
Haddonfield Memorial High School with 869 students in grades 9-12
Tammy McHale, Principal 
Hamisi Tarrant, Dean of Students 
Dan Licata, Assistant Principal

Administration

 Superintendent, Chuck Klaus 
 Business Administrator, Michael Catalano 
 Chief Academic Officer, Dr. Colleen Murray 
 Assistant Superintendent, Dr. Gino Priolo 
 Director of Special Education, Carmen Henderson

Board of education
The district's board of education, with nine members, sets policy and oversees the fiscal and educational operation of the district through its administration. As a Type II school district, the board's trustees are elected directly by voters to serve three-year terms of office on a staggered basis, with three seats up for election each year held (since 2012) as part of the November general election. In addition to their work on the board as a whole, each board member chairs a three-member committee which meets throughout the year to discuss specific issues. Major board committees include finance, student life, buildings and grounds, and communications.

Operations
In 1948, during de jure educational segregation in the United States, children of all races attended the same school, but white and black children were put in separate classes for grades 1-4.

References

External links

School Data for the Haddonfield Public Schools, National Center for Education Statistics

Haddonfield, New Jersey
Pine Valley, New Jersey
Tavistock, New Jersey
New Jersey District Factor Group J
School districts in Camden County, New Jersey